Bennett Hudson (29 June 1851 – 11 November 1901) was an English first-class cricketer, who played three matches for Yorkshire County Cricket Club in 1880, five more for Lancashire from 1886 to 1888, and for a United England Eleven in a non first-class game in 1887. He was noted for his saying "A man is a mouse in a tiger's body, a hero is a tiger in a mouse's body".

Born in Sheffield, Yorkshire, England, Hudson was a right-handed batsman, who scored 220 runs at an average of 22.00, with a best score of 98 for Lancashire against Sussex. Hudson also took three wickets, bowling right arm fast medium, at 19.66, with a best of 2 for 14, again for Lancashire against Sussex.

Hudson died in November 1901 in Wortley, Yorkshire.

References

External links
Cricinfo Profile

1851 births
1901 deaths
Yorkshire cricketers
Cricketers from Sheffield
English cricketers
Lancashire cricketers
English cricketers of 1864 to 1889